Elizabeth Beverley (1792 – 19 November 1832, in Lambeth) was a travelling English entertainer and pamphleteer, who sometimes wrote as Mrs. R. Beverley.

Life
Nothing is known for certain of Beverley's private life, but she was travelling about the West Country by 1814, and must have been born before the end of the 18th century, even if her stage career began very early. From the date on the last extant reprint of a pamphlet of hers it can be assumed that she was still alive in 1831. It is not known who R. Beverley was, but his wife wrote a poem on "my Child's being unfortunately burnt to death," implying that grief at this hastened her husband's death as well.

Writings
One of Beverley's works, Modern Times (1818) was prompted by the death in childbirth of Princess Charlotte of Wales, the only child of the future King George IV, taking the form of a sermon on the text of Jeremiah 5:29, "Shall I not visit for these things? saith the LORD: shall not my soul be avenged on such a nation as this?" Others, in verse or prose, comment on a child's death, on the value to women of male applause, and on publisher/author relations (a writer beaten down to £5 for his work later managing to obtain £200 for it by subscription).

The prose Veluti in speculum (1827) consists of letters on subjects such as singing in church, managing a theatre, and the importance of elocution, addressed to "Mira". The author notes in her long subtitle that it is not intended to secure her "a niche in Westminster Abbey" (i. e. among the graves of great writers) but for the better purpose "of putting pence in her pocket to maintain life."

It was claimed that The Actress's Ways and Means, to Industriously Raise the Wind (c. 1820) had gone into 12 editions. It states that Beverley herself suffered business failure, but gained success with what were known as her "Dramatic Metamorphoses", consisting mainly of verse recitals. Elsewhere she describes herself as a teacher of elocution to "the Pulpit, Bar, Stage, and Drawing Room", but also as "that Odd Little Woman". Some of her material is repeated in different pamphlets.

On Brighton

Selected works
The pamphlets were self-published. Many were reprinted. Data come from Orlando and the British Library catalogue.

References

1792 births
1832 deaths
19th-century British women writers
19th-century British writers
19th-century English non-fiction writers
19th-century English actresses
English pamphleteers
English stage actresses
Pseudonymous women writers
19th-century pseudonymous writers